Andrew Lancaster is an Australian film director.

At the Asia-Pacific Film Festival, he won the "Best Short Film" award in 1993 for Palace Cafe and the "Best Film Award" in 2002 for In Search of Mike. His 2014 documentary The Lost Aviator premiered at the London Film Festival. Joud (2018), based in Saudi Arabia, has been noted for its absence of dialogue.

Filmography
 Palace Cafe (1993)
 Universal Appliance (1994)
 In Search of Mike (2000)
 Syntax Error (2003)
 Accidents Happen (2009)
 The Lost Aviator (2014)
 Joud (2018)

Awards and nominations

ARIA Music Awards
The ARIA Music Awards is an annual awards ceremony that recognises excellence, innovation, and achievement across all genres of Australian music. They commenced in 1987. 

! 
|-
| 1996
| Andrew Lancaster for "Soldiers" by You Am I
|rowspan="2" |Best Video
| 
|rowspan="2" |  
|-
| 1999
| Andrew Lancaster and David McCormack for "Girls Like That (Don't Go For Guys Like Us)" by Custard
| 
|-

References

External links
 

Year of birth missing (living people)
Living people
ARIA Award winners
Australian film directors